The 2012 Tim Hortons Brier, the Canadian men's national curling championship, was held from March 3 to March 11 at the Credit Union Centre in Saskatoon, Saskatchewan. This Brier marked the sixth time that Saskatoon hosted the Brier; the last time that the Brier was hosted in Saskatoon was in 2004. The winner of the Brier, Glenn Howard, will represent Canada at the 2012 Capital One World Men's Curling Championship in Basel, Switzerland.

In the final, Ontario's Glenn Howard defeated Kevin Koe in ten ends with a score of 7–6. Howard won his fourth Brier title overall and his second Brier title as skip. Ontario third Wayne Middaugh became the first person in Brier history to win at three different positions, as second in 1993, as skip in 1998, and as third in 2012. Middaugh also set a record for best performance by a third in the final (with 98%), and won the Hec Gervais Award, which was awarded to the most valuable player in the playoffs.

This edition of the Brier saw the first Northwest Territories/Yukon team advancing to the page playoffs in Brier history since the induction of the playoffs format in 1980. Previously, the best performance from the Territories came in 1975, when Yukon's Don Twa and his team tied for second place after the round robin. In 1985, the Territories made it to a tiebreaker before being knocked out. The Brier also saw Ontario skip Glenn Howard breaking the record for most career games played at the Brier, which was previously set by his brother Russ Howard at 174 career games, after defeating Saskatchewan in Draw 10.

Teams
At this year's Brier, Alberta was represented by former Brier champion and former world champion Kevin Koe, who defeated Brock Virtue in the provincial final. He made his second appearance at the Brier with a new third, Pat Simmons, who had skipped for Saskatchewan in five previous Briers. Brad Gushue of Newfoundland and Labrador clinched a sixth straight berth to the Brier after defeating former provincial champion Ken Peddigrew in the provincial final. Gushue made his ninth appearance at the Brier with a new team formed at the close of the last season. Northern Ontario was represented by Brad Jacobs, who played at his third consecutive Brier after defeating former provincial champion Mike Jakubo in the provincial final. Glenn Howard of Ontario made his seventh consecutive and fourteenth overall appearance at the Brier after winning the provincial final over Peter Corner. Rob Fowler of Manitoba made his first appearance at the Brier after defeating Mike McEwen in the provincial final. Kevin Martin and Jeff Stoughton, two recent Brier champions who together won three of the past four Briers, were both eliminated before the finals of their respective provincial championships.

British Columbia was represented by Jim Cotter after Cotter, who played at his third Brier, won his second straight provincial championship over Brent Pierce. Terry Odishaw made his first appearance at the Brier since 1998 after winning the New Brunswick final over defending provincial champion James Grattan. Jamie Murphy represented Nova Scotia at his first Brier, after defeating former Brier champion Mark Dacey in the final of the provincials. Prince Edward Island was represented by Mike Gaudet, who made his fourth Brier appearance, his first as skip since 2004, as he was the third for last year's Prince Edward Island skip Eddie MacKenzie. Robert Desjardins represented Quebec at his second consecutive Brier, his first Brier as skip, after defeating Phillipe Lemay in the provincial final. Saskatchewan was represented by Scott Manners, his first appearance at the Brier after upsetting Bruce Korte in the provincial final. Jamie Koe made his fourth consecutive and sixth overall appearance representing the Northwest Territories and Yukon after finishing the provincials with an undefeated record.

Round-robin standings
Final round-robin standings

Round-robin results
All times listed in Central Standard Time (UTC-06).

Draw 1
Saturday, March 3, 1:30 PM

Draw 2
Saturday, March 3, 6:30 PM

Draw 3
Sunday, March 4, 8:30 AM

Draw 4
Sunday, March 4, 1:30 PM

Draw 5
Sunday, March 4, 6:30 PM

Draw 6
Monday, March 5, 8:30 AM

Draw 7
Monday, March 5, 1:30 PM

Draw 8
Monday, March 5, 6:30 PM

Draw 9
Tuesday, March 6, 8:30 AM

Draw 10
Tuesday, March 6, 1:30 PM

Draw 11
Tuesday, March 6, 6:30 PM

Draw 12
Wednesday, March 7, 8:30 AM

Draw 13
Wednesday, March 7, 1:30 PM

Draw 14
Wednesday, March 7, 6:30 PM

Draw 15
Thursday, March 8, 8:30 AM

Draw 16
Thursday, March 8, 1:30 PM

Draw 17
Thursday, March 8, 6:30 PM

Playoffs

1 vs. 2
Friday, March 9, 6:30 PM

3 vs. 4
Saturday, March 10, 1:30 PM

Semifinal
Saturday, March 10, 7:00 PM

Bronze medal game
Sunday, March 11, 9:00 AM

Final
Sunday, March 11, 6:00 PM

Top 5 player percentages
The top five player percentages for each position from the round robin are listed as follows:

Awards and honours
The all-star teams and award winners are as follows:

All-Star Teams
First Team
Skip:  Glenn Howard, Ontario
Third:  Wayne Middaugh, Ontario
Second:  Carter Rycroft, Alberta
Lead:  Derek Samagalski, Manitoba

Second Team
Skip:  Kevin Koe, Alberta
Third:  Allan Lyburn, Manitoba
Second:  Brent Laing, Ontario
Lead:  Nolan Thiessen, Alberta

Ross Harstone Award
 Scott Manners, Saskatchewan skip

Scotty Harper Award
Paul Wiecek, Winnipeg Free Press
Wiecek received a $500 media award

Paul McLean Award
Len Dubyts, CBC & TSN overhead camera operator

Notes

References

External links

 
The Brier
Curling in Saskatoon
2012 in Saskatchewan
2012 in Canadian curling